Jahanian, 
(Punjabi جہانیاں) is a tehsil near Multan city in Khanewal District, Punjab, Pakistan. 

It is one of four Sub-divisions of Khanewal district. Previously known as Jahanian Mandi. It is a small city surrounded by villages. The city Jahanian is the headquarter of tehsil Jahanian. Most of the area consists of agriculture land. It is 30 minutes drive from Dokota (28 km) and 45 minutes drive from Multan (42 km). The town is located at the crossroads of the Khanewal–Lodhran National Highway (N-5A), and the Multan–Delhi Grand Trunk Road. It is situated at 416 feet above sea level. Tehsil Jahanian is situated at a point where district Vehari, Khanewal, Lodhran and Multan adjoin as follows.

•  North:                      District Khanewal

•  West:                       District Multan

•  South:                      District Lodhran

•  East:                       District Vehari

Transport
There is a railway station and a public bus stand. People rely mostly on public station van-type transport. As Jahanian is situated at the National Highway (N5-A) bypass, people can easily get conveyance all of the time during day and night. From this bypass, passengers can go to Lahore, Islamabad, Faisalabad, Bahawalpur, Sadiqabad, Sukkur, Hyderabad and Karachi.

References 

Populated places in Khanewal District

simple:Jahanian Tehsil